Banater Arbeiter-Presse ('Banat Workers Press') was a German language socialist newspaper published from Jimbolia, Romania between 1925 and 1927. The first issue of Banater Arbeiter-Presse was published on July 3, 1925. The newspaper was published weekly. Banater Arbeiter-Presse was an organ of the Banat Socialist Party. Banater Arbeiter-Presse was of great help for the socialist movement in Jimbolia, helping the party to win the local elections of 1926.

References

1925 establishments in Romania
1927 disestablishments in Romania
Banat
Defunct newspapers published in Romania
German-language newspapers published in Romania
Publications established in 1925
Publications disestablished in 1927
Socialist newspapers